Acton is an unincorporated community in McNairy County, Tennessee, in the United States.

History
It is believed that it is most likely named after Acton, England.

References

Unincorporated communities in McNairy County, Tennessee
Unincorporated communities in Tennessee